Lonnie Torian (September 26, 1895 – March 19, 1969) was an American Negro league pitcher in the 1920s.

A native of Massac, Kentucky, Torian played for the St. Louis Giants in 1920. He died in Paducah, Kentucky in 1969 at age 73.

References

External links
 and Seamheads

1895 births
1969 deaths
St. Louis Giants players
Baseball pitchers
Baseball players from Kentucky
People from McCracken County, Kentucky
20th-century African-American sportspeople